Pilgrims Book House is a publishing and bookselling company founded in Kathmandu, Nepal in 1984. It formerly published books under the Book Faith India imprint and now publishes under the Pilgrims Publishing imprint. Pilgrims Book House is currently headquartered in Varanasi, India.

Pilgrims Book House sells and publishes books in a number of South Asian and Western languages. Its areas of speciality include:
Buddhism
Hinduism and yoga
Mountaineering
Reprints of classic books on India, Nepal, Tibet and Central Asia
Languages (Nepali, Tibetan, Hindi)
Children's books

Company history
Pilgrims Book House was established by Puspa and Rama Nand ("Rama") Tiwari in Kathmandu in 1984, succeeding the Tiwaris' earlier book business in Varanasi. In the year 1999 they started a branch in Varanasi, and in 2006 a second branch opened in Delhi.

For many years the main Pilgrims Book House bookshop branch in Kathmandu was located in Thamel. It was one of the largest bookshops in Asia with hundreds of thousands of books on display. It was praised by several travel guidebooks and websites (including by Lonely Planet who called it "Kathmandu's best bookstore").

On 16 May 2013 the Thamel branch of Pilgrims Book House caught fire and almost everything inside was burnt to ashes.  Since the fire Pilgrims has operated two bookshops, one at JP Road, Thamel, Kathmandu and the other at Durgakund, Varanasi.

Pilgrims operates two websites, one for its bookstores and the other for its publishing division. The company also maintains a rare books department.

Publications
Pilgrims Book House has published more than 1700 books. These include:
Paul Brunton, A Message from Arunachala, Pilgrims Publishing, 2009, .
W. Y. Evans-Wentz, The Tibetan Book of the Dead, Pilgrims Publishing, 2010, .
Jim Goodman, Pokhara in the Shadow of the Annapurnas, Book Faith India, 1997, with photos by Galen Rowell and John Everingham, .
Eva Kipp, Bending Bamboo Changing Winds: Nepali Women Tell Their Life Stories, Pilgrims Publishing, 2006, .
B. P. Koirala, Faulty Glasses and Other Stories, Pilgrims Publishing, 2002, .
James Prinsep and O. P. Kejariwal,  "Benares Illustrated" and "James Prinsep and Benares" , Pilgrims Publishing, 2009, .
A. P. Sinnett, Esoteric Buddhism, Pilgrims Publishing, 2002, .
J. R. Santiago, Kriya Yoga: The Science of Self-Realization, Book Faith India, 1999, .
Tania Sironic, Thangka Coloring Book. Pilgrims Publishing, 2007, .
Daisetz Teitaro Suzuki,  The Lankavatara Sutra, Pilgrims Publishing, 2005, .
H. W. Tilman, Mount Everest 1938, Pilgrims Publishing, 2004,  (contains the infamous Appendix B on the Yeti).
B. D. Tripathi, Sadhus of India, Pilgrims Publishing, 2004, .
Geert Verbeki, Bowls: An ABC. Pilgrims Publishing, 2005, .
David Paul Wagner, Hindi Phrasebook: A Pilgrims Key to Hindi, Pilgrims Publishing, 1999, .

Book series
 Everest Series
 Pilgrims Colouring Book Series
 Pilgrims Folk Tales
 Pilgrims Pocket Series
 Pilgrims Quotation Series

References

External links
Pilgrims Book House - bookshop division website
Pilgrims Publishing - publishing division website
Jane and Michael Stern,  "Nirvana Express", The New York Times, 19 February 2009 - mention of Rama Tiwari and Pilgrims Book House in review of Rory MacLean's Magic Bus: On the Hippie Trail From Istanbul to India 
Ramanand Tiwari, seopati. com - article (in Nepali) profiling Ramanand Tiwari, the Pilgrims Book House proprietor
Tarquin Hall, "In search of paradise", New Statesman. 17 July 2006 - Rama Tiwari quoted on happiness
 Fire: Pilgrims Book House - 17 May 2013 - पिलग्रिम्स बुक हाउस ठमेल - ABC Hot News Express (Kathmandu) footage and interviews
 Fire at Thamel - video from night of 17 May 2013
 Pilgrims Book House: Largest Book Store Of Nepal - tour of the rebuilt bookstore, 2022

Book publishing companies of India
Bookstores of India
Book publishing companies of Nepal
Bookstores of Nepal
Publishing companies established in 1984
1984 establishments in Nepal
Nepalese culture
Indian culture